Reports of cases in the High Court of Chancery, with some few in other courts, from 1737 to 1783 is the title of a collection of nominate reports, by Charles Ambler, of cases decided by the Court of Chancery between approximately 1737 and 1784. For the purpose of citation their name may be abbreviated to "Amb". They are reprinted in volume 27 of the English Reports.

J. G. Marvin said:

References
Reports of cases in the High Court of Chancery, with some few in other courts, from 1737 to 1783. Second edition, with corrections from the Registrar's Books, references to subsequent cases, a new index, and a list of cases cited or referred to in the text. By J E Blunt. London. 1828. Part 1, Part 2  .

Sets of reports reprinted in the English Reports
Court of Chancery